The 1966 Ice Hockey World Championships was the 33rd edition of the Ice Hockey World Championships. The tournament was held in Hala Tivoli, Ljubljana, SR Slovenia, SFR Yugoslavia from 3 to 14 March 1966. For the fourth straight year, the Soviet Union won the tournament.  For the Soviets, it was their sixth World and tenth European title. Czechoslovakia beat both Canada and Sweden two to one, to take the Silver, while the Swedes' historic loss to East Germany helped put them fourth behind Canada for the Bronze.

The lower two tiers (Groups B and C) were formalized, so there would be no more qualifying tournaments with promotion and relegation taking places between these two tournaments as well.  West Germany won all their games to return to the top level of competition while Great Britain went winless and was replaced by Group C winner Italy.

Qualifying round Group B/C (Bucharest Romania)

Romania qualified in Group B

Italy and France qualified in Group C

World Championship Group A (Ljubljana)
The Canadian national team players wanted to withdraw from the World Championships in protest of the officiating in a loss to the Czechoslovakian national team in which Canada was the more-penalized team and had two goals disallowed. The team's manager Father David Bauer stayed up all night with the team and talked them into continuing to avoid a national embarrassment and sanctions against the team.

Final round 

Poland was relegated to Group B for 1967.

World Championship Group B (Zagreb)

Final round 

West Germany was promoted to the top level while Great Britain was relegated to Group C for 1967 (but did not participate again until 1971).

World Championship Group C (Jesenice)
A Yugoslav 'B' team participated unofficially in the tournament, playing games against each of the three other participating nations. This was South Africa's last appearance in the World Championships until 1992.

Final round 

Italy was promoted to Group B, France decided not to participate, Yugoslavia B team participated instead of France

Ranking and statistics

Tournament Awards
Best players selected by the directorate:
Best Goaltender:       Seth Martin
Best Defenceman:       Alexander Ragulin
Best Forward:          Konstantin Loktev
Media All-Star Team:
Goaltender:  Seth Martin
Defence:  Gary Begg,  Alexander Ragulin
Forwards:  Veniamin Alexandrov,  Fran Huck,  Konstantin Loktev

Final standings
The final standings of the tournament according to IIHF:

European championships final standings
Please note:  At the time of the championship Sweden was awarded the bronze, however, East Germany should have won because of their better record amongst only European clubs. In 1999 this mistake was corrected and living players were presented with the medals they were supposed to have won.

The final standings of the European championships according to IIHF:

Citations

References

 
Summary (in french)

 

IIHF Men's World Ice Hockey Championships
World Championships
1966
1966
Sports competitions in Ljubljana
March 1966 sports events in Europe
1960s in Ljubljana
1960s in Zagreb
Sports competitions in Zagreb
Sport in Jesenice, Jesenice